Sheng Liu from the Huazhong University of Science and Technology, Wuhan, China was named Fellow of the Institute of Electrical and Electronics Engineers (IEEE) in 2014 for leadership in engineering development of LED packaging.

References

Fellow Members of the IEEE
Living people
Year of birth missing (living people)
Place of birth missing (living people)
Academic staff of Huazhong University of Science and Technology